Sajóhídvég is a village in Borsod-Abaúj-Zemplén County in north-eastern Hungary.

References

Populated places in Borsod-Abaúj-Zemplén County